Onebala is a genus of moths in the family Gelechiidae.

Species
Onebala amethystina (Meyrick, 1904) (from Australia)
Onebala blandiella Walker, 1864 (from Sri Lanka)
Onebala brunneotincta Janse, 1954 (from South Africa)
Onebala choristis (Meyrick, 1904) (from Australia)
Onebala euargyra (Turner, 1919) (from Australia)
Onebala iridosoma (Meyrick, 1918) (from Australia)
Onebala obsoleta Janse, 1954 (from South Africa, Namibia)
Onebala probolaspis Meyrick, 1929 (from South Africa)
Onebala semiluna Janse, 1954  (from South Africa)
Onebala zapyrodes (Turner, 1919) (from Australia)
Onebala zulu (Walsingham, 1881) (from South Africa, Namibia)

Former species
Onebala bifrenata Meyrick, 1921
Onebala crypsizyga Meyrick, 1914
Onebala cubiculata Meyrick, 1911
Onebala elaphopis Meyrick, 1910
Onebala eremota Meyrick, 1911
Onebala hibisci (Stainton, 1859)
Onebala homogramma Meyrick, 1918
Onebala myadelpha Meyrick, 1910

References

Walker, 1864; List Spec. Lepid. Insects Colln Br. Mus. 29: 792
Markku Savela's: www.nic.funet.fi

 
Dichomeridinae
Moth genera